"It Won't Stop" is a song recorded by American singer Sevyn Streeter, featuring vocals from American singer Chris Brown. It was released on May 22, 2013, as the first single from her debut extended play (EP) Call Me Crazy, But..., by Atlantic Records. The single achieved Platinum status from Recording Industry Association of America and received a warm reception from industry critics and the public.

Reception 
According to the Vibe magazine, the single "dominated the Mainstream R&B/Hip-Hop Airplay category for nine weeks straight" upon its release.

NPR has described the song as having "sunk into our collective consciousness through commercial radio play and a music video viewed more than 35 million times [as of 2014] and on the recommendation of a growing group of critics and fans", with lyrics that are "vernacular, warm, and unpretentious".

Background and composition 
The song was premiered on May 22, 2013. On June 24, 2013, Streeter released an acoustic performance video for the single. "It Won't Stop" is described as a contemporary R&B song.

Streeter released the remix to the song on August 28, 2013. It features Chris Brown. Streeter released an extended play of a collection of remixes featuring Brown on February 18, 2014.

Music video 
On October 10, 2013, Streeter uploaded the music video for the remix on her YouTube account. The video for the remix also premiered on BET's 106 & Park and was directed by Brown who also appears in the video along with NBA player Dorell Wright, playing  Sevyn's love interest.

Track listing

Charts

Weekly charts

Year-end charts

Certifications and sales

Release history

References

External links 
Acoustic performance by Streeter, 2014, via the NPR web site

2013 singles
Sevyn Streeter songs
Chris Brown songs
Songs written by Chris Brown
Songs written by Sevyn Streeter
Songs written by Jean-Baptiste (songwriter)
Song recordings produced by Diplo